Holocola dolopaea is a species of moth in the family Tortricidae. It is endemic to New Zealand.

Taxonomy 
This species was first described by Edward Meyrick in 1905 and named Strepsicrates dolopaea.

References 

Moths described in 1905
Eucosmini
Moths of New Zealand
Endemic fauna of New Zealand
Taxa named by Edward Meyrick
Endemic moths of New Zealand